Gogana specularis is a moth in the family Drepanidae first described by Francis Walker in 1866. It is found on Borneo and Peninsular Malaysia.

Adults are purplish cinereous (ash grey), the wings with a very few indistinct darker lines. There is a slightly curved submarginal line of whitish points and a dark brown marginal line. The forewings have a short exterior band, consisting of five connected brown-bordered nearly hyaline (glass-like) spots.

References

Moths described in 1866
Drepaninae
Taxa named by Francis Walker (entomologist)